Ulyanovsk State Technical University (abbreviated as UlSTU) is a major technical higher education and research institution in Ulyanovsk. Founded in 1957 as Ulyanovsk Polytech University, the university is located in the Volga River region.

Ulyanovsk State Technical University (UlSTU) is one of the leading science centers of the Volga region that trains specialists in various areas, including economy, humanities, technical sciences, etc.

The university is well known in Russia for its research-and-development activities; graduates of UlSTU are employed by a large variety of companies. Today Ulyanovsk State Technical University has over 12,000 students in different educational programs at 12 faculties and 48 departments; more than 500 tutors, 42 Ph.D professors and 250 PhD associate professors; scientific and research works and papers awarded in Paris, Brussels etc.; and one of the biggest concert halls in the Middle Volga region.

The university maintains firm contacts with more than 60 state, public and educational organizations of many countries: universities, research centers, foundations. UlSTU closely cooperates with such educational and scientific centers as Darmstadt University of Applied Sciences, Germany; Durham University, Great Britain; University of Göttingen, Germany.

Sporting facilities, a calendar of social events and a reputation for teaching makes UlSTU a place to study. Students from Ukraine, Kazakhstan, Germany, China, Vietnam, Turkey, Ghana, Cameroon, and Nigeria successfully study at the university.

 Three institutes, including: International Institute, Institute of Aviation Technologies and Management, Institute of Distance and Additional Education;
 Twelve faculties, including: pre-university training faculty, faculty of humanities, extramural education faculty, engineering and economics faculty, engineering faculty, mechanical engineering faculty, radio engineering faculty, aircraft construction faculty, civil engineering faculty, faculty of information systems and technologies, faculty of high professional education, power engineering faculty;
 One branch, colleges, academies, educational and research centers, and other departments.

History 
The story of the Ulyanovsk State Technical University begins in 1957 when on September 18 the Polytechnical institute was founded. In 1993 it received its present official name, Ulyanovsk State Technical University.

It is one of the largest scientific, educational and cultural centers of the Volga region. UlSTU trains highly skilled specialists in a wide range of technical and mathematical sciences, humanities and economics as well. 

UlSTU is proud of its history, its alumni and high educational standards that include practical training, research, and innovations. UlSTU is a leading university in intellectual property certificates obtained in Russia (more than 5400 patents on inventions, utility models and other objects).

Faculties and institutes

Faculty of humanities 

 Publishing
 Advertising and public relations
 Linguistics

Engineering and economics faculty 

 Quality management
 Systems analysis and process control
 Innovation studies
 Economics
 Management
 Human resource management
 State and municipal management
 Commerce

Faculty of information systems and technologies 

 Applied mathematics
 Information and computer sciences
 Information systems and technologies
 Applied informatics
 Software engineering

Mechanical engineering faculty

Civil engineering faculty

Power engineering faculty 

 Heat and power engineering

Radio engineering faculty 

 Radio engineering

Extramural faculty

International institute 

 Oil and gas engineering

Institute of Aviation Technologies and Management

Institute of Distance and Additional Education

Students and staff 
The university offers pre-university training for foreign students.

About 300 people from all over the world regularly attend the program, many of whom then become students at the university.

More than 700 foreign students from 35 countries, including Vietnam, China, Iraq, Yemen, Japan, Palestine, Egypt, Guinea-Bissau, Côte d'Ivoire, Bangladesh, etc. are studying at UlSTU.

International relations 
The number of foreign students entering the high school, undergoing training or attending courses increases annually.

UlSTU extends international relations by cooperating with universities and research centers from Germany, the US, Austria, China, Japan, Poland, Bulgaria, and Italy. Friendship and joint scientific and research activities with Hochschule Darmstadt for over 10 years is the pride of the Polytech. Today 18,000 students (including international) study at UlSTU.

The university develops international activities and cooperates with educational and scientific centers in Germany, China, the Czech Republic, the US, Austria, Japan, Poland, Bulgaria, etc.

The university holds international conferences and regularly invites foreign and Russian specialists to give lectures and exchange experience.

Facts and figures 

 More than 8,000 students, including more than 450 foreign students from 35 countries
 Three institutes and twelve faculties
 52 departments, 81 programs of study
 More than 500 teachers, including 42 professors, doctors of sciences, about 250 associate professors, candidates of sciences, more than 50 members and corresponding members of industry academies
 Equipped lecture halls and laboratories;
 Large library, with about 1,200,000 books, magazines, electronic publications, video materials and other information sources;
 84 buildings and structures, including eight educational buildings, six hostels, seven apartment houses, two sports halls, the stadium, canteens, sanatorium, summer camp and others

References 
 http://raexpert.ru/rankings/vuz/vuz2014/vuz_reputation_2014/

External links
 USTU's Official Site, English Version

Universities in Volga Region
Ulyanovsk
Buildings and structures in Ulyanovsk Oblast
Technical universities and colleges in Russia
1957 establishments in Russia
Educational institutions established in 1957
Universities and institutes established in the Soviet Union
Public universities and colleges in Russia